Tomislav Ašković (born May 4, 1951) is a former distance runner who competed for Yugoslavia at the 1986 European Athletics Championships and the 1987 Mediterranean Games in the marathon.

Running career
In 1979, Ašković won the "Liberation of Ludbreg Race" in Ludbreg, finishing ahead of runner-up Marjan Krempl who would later become a successful marathoner. On July 8, 1980, he ran his personal best in the 5000 meters in 13:47.80, finishing in sixth place at the Rosicky Memorial track meet at Stadion Evžena Rošického.

Ašković ran the 1986 New York City Marathon, where he finished in 25th place in a time of 2:18:27. He finished in 14th place in the men's marathon at the 1986 European Athletics Championships in a time of 2:15:27. On June 7, 1987, he won the Novi Sad Marathon in 2:14:30, although the course was short according to the Association of Road Racing Statisticians. He finished in fifth place in the men's marathon at the 1987 Mediterranean Games.

Later career
In 1995, Ašković and Branislav Petrović started a magazine called YU-Maraton. After nine issues, the magazine was discontinued after 1997. He started an athletics club in Žabljak, but by 2012 the club was disbanded due to lack of interest.

References

1951 births
Living people
Serbian male long-distance runners
Yugoslav male long-distance runners
Yugoslav male marathon runners
Athletes (track and field) at the 1987 Mediterranean Games
Mediterranean Games competitors for Yugoslavia